Sverre Mitsem may refer to:

Sverre Mitsem (judge), Norwegian Supreme Court Justice
Sverre Mitsem (writer), Norwegian writer